Tegostoma stangei is a moth in the family Crambidae. It was described by Zerney in 1916. It is found in Transcaspia and northern Afghanistan.

References

Odontiini
Moths described in 1916
Moths of Asia